Streptomyces venezuelae is a species of soil-dwelling Gram-positive bacterium of the genus Streptomyces.
S. venezuelae is filamentous. In its spore-bearing stage, hyphae perfuse both above ground as aerial hyphae and in the soil substrate.
Chloramphenicol, the first antibiotic to be manufactured synthetically on a large scale, was originally derived from S. venezuelae. Other secondary metabolites produced by S. venezuelae  include jadomycin and pikromycin.

See also 
Chloramphenicol phosphotransferase-like protein family

References

Further reading

External links
Type strain of Streptomyces venezuelae at BacDive – the Bacterial Diversity Metadatabase

venezuelae
Bacteria described in 1948